Glodeanu Sărat is a commune in Buzău County, Muntenia, Romania. It is composed of four villages: Căldărușanca, Glodeanu Sărat, Ileana and Pitulicea.

Notes

Communes in Buzău County
Localities in Muntenia